Chupke Chupke Raat Din is a popular ghazal written by Maulana Hasrat Mohani. The music composition is based on Raga Kaafi. It is a classical Urdu poem that represents the culture of the Mughal Dynasty. The poem became famous after it was sung by Ghulam Ali. This piece was also included in the film Nikaah (1982) in a shorter version.

Original lyrics

Popularity
This ghazal has been sung by many notable singers of Pakistan such as Ghulam Ali, who popularized it by singing it in the 1982 film Nikaah. Indian Singer Asha Bhosle and Indian Ghazal singer Jagjit Singh have also rendered their voices to this ghazal.

References

External links
 Chupke Chupke Raat Din  in BBC

Ghazal songs
Pakistani songs
Indian songs